ABC Islamic Bank is a Joint Stock Company that provides investment banking services and asset management services in accordance with Islamic principles. It is a wholly owned subsidiary of Arab Banking Corporation.

Its formerly known as ABC Investment and Services Company until March 1998, established on 1987.

Subsidiary companies:
ABC Clearing Company
ABC Islamic Fund

See also

List of banks
List of banks in Bahrain

External links
 ABC Official website (Global)
   ABC International Bank plc (ABCIB), (London)
 ABC Algeria
 ABC Jordan
 ABC Egypt
 ABC Brasil
 Islamic Banking Law

References 

1998 establishments in Bahrain
Banks established in 1998
 Islamic Banking